The Grünbach Formation is an Austrian geological formation that dates to the lower Campanian age of the Late Cretaceous. it forms part of the Gosau Group, and represents a marine regression event, representing a coastal/brackish environment, being underlain by the marine carbonate Maiersdorf Formation and overlain by the deep marine siliciclastic Piesting Formation. The main lithology is clay, marl, siltstone and sandstone, with a minor conglomerate component. Coal seams have also been noted. It is notable for its fossils including those of dinosaurs and plants.

Vertebrate paleofauna 
All remains have been found at a single locality, which is a thin marl seam in the Konstantin mining tunnel, within the Felbering Mine in the Neue Welt area north west of Muthmannsdorf in Lower Austria. The initial remains were discovered in 1859 after an ornithopod tooth was found in a piece of coal in a dump outside the mine by Professor Ferdinand Stoliczka, and the productive seam discovered thereafter. The first material was described by Emanuel Bunzel in 1871 and then additional material was described by Harry Seeley in 1881. Due to mining activity in the area ceasing at the end of the 19th century, no additional remains have been recovered since.

Squamates

Crocodyliformes

Choristoderes

Turtles

Pterosaurs

Non-avian dinosaurs

Flora 
Most of these specimens were recovered from mining dumps near Grünbach am Schneeberg in lower Austria. The flora of the formation is considered to represent that of a high humidity subtropical climate, typical of the Euro-Sinian phytogeographical region.

Bryophytes

Lycopodiophyta

Pteridophytes

Gymnosperms

Angiosperms

Monocots

Dicots

References 

Geologic formations of Austria
Upper Cretaceous Series of Europe
Campanian Stage
Cretaceous Austria
Paleontology in Austria